Abu al-Mundhir (? – 1114 in Yabisa, Eastern Isles of Al-Andalus) was an Andalusi Muslim military commander, originally a Catalan renegade from Girona. By the time of the Catalan-Pisan expedition against Mayurqa, he was designated directly by the wali of Mayurqa as the commander of the Muslim forces that defended Yabisa from the Pisan invaders. He is reported to have disappeared during the catastrophe that followed the fall of madinat Yabisa to the Pisan besieging army.

References

1114 deaths
Military personnel from Catalonia
Catalan Muslims
Generals of the medieval Islamic world
Soldiers from Catalonia
People of the Reconquista
Year of birth unknown
Converts to Islam
Converts to Sunni Islam from Catholicism
12th-century people from al-Andalus